The Licorice of Atri is an Italian agri-food product grown in Atri in Abruzzo with licorice fresh or dried and its extract.

History 
Licorice of Atri has been cultivated in Abruzzo since Roman times, and in the Middle Ages the friars already used it by extracting the juice; the region Abruzzo is after Calabria for licorice production. Famous in Italy are the licorice trunks of the candy Tabù produced by the company R. De Rosa founded in 1836 in Atri in Abruzzo.

Production 
Atri's licorice is marketed in the following forms:
 wheel
 sticks
 minnows
 filled sugared almonds
candy

See also

 Cuisine of Abruzzo

References

Cuisine of Abruzzo
Abruzzo